Joshua Patrick William Spence (born 22 January 1988) is an Australian former professional baseball pitcher. He pitched in Major League Baseball (MLB) for the San Diego Padres.

Career
Spence enrolled at Central Arizona College, and played for their baseball team in 2007 and 2008.  He was selected in 25th round of the 2008 draft by the Arizona Diamondbacks but did not sign. He transferred to Arizona State University to play for the Sun Devils for the 2009 season going 10–1 with a 2.37 ERA, where he joined Mike Leake and Seth Blair in the Sun Devils' starting rotation.  He was selected in the 3rd round of the 2009 draft by the Los Angeles Angels of Anaheim, but did not sign. He sat out the 2010 ASU season with an undetermined injury. After the 2010 season, he played collegiate summer baseball with the Cotuit Kettleers of the Cape Cod Baseball League. He was drafted by the Padres in the ninth round of the 2010 Major League Baseball Draft, and signed with them for a $100,000 bonus.

He was called up by San Diego on 21 June 2011, after they designated Luis Durango for assignment to make room for him on the 40-man roster. 
Spence made his debut on 25 June 2011 in the top of the ninth inning against the Atlanta Braves; he faced three All-Stars in Jason Heyward, Chipper Jones, and Brian McCann, setting them down in order. He became the 29th Australian to reach the Majors and first pitcher since Rich Thompson debuted for the Angels in 2007.

The Padres designated Spence for assignment after the 2012 season. The New York Yankees claimed Spence off waivers on 6 November. He was designated for assignment by the Yankees on 14 December. He signed a minor league deal with the Miami Marlins in December 2013. On 1 April 2014, he was assigned to AAA New Orleans Zephyrs. He was released on 20 May 2014. Spence signed with the Amarillo Sox of the American Association of Independent Professional Baseball following his release. He is currently the Minor League Pitching Coach for the San Diego Padres short season affiliate.

Pitching style
Spence is a finesse pitcher, relying on pitch location and movement rather than overpowering speed. His two main pitches are a sinker averaging about 84 mph and a slider averaging 78. He also has a changeup at 76-77 mph that he uses often against right-handed hitters.

Personal life
Spence's brother, Liam, played college baseball at Tennessee and was selected by the Chicago Cubs in the fifth round of the 2021 Major League Baseball draft. Their middle brother, Nic, played baseball at Cincinnati.

References

External links

1988 births
Living people
San Diego Padres players
Arizona State Sun Devils baseball players
Australian expatriate baseball players in the United States
Central Arizona Vaqueros baseball players
Cotuit Kettleers players
Arizona League Padres players
Eugene Emeralds players
Fort Wayne TinCaps players
San Antonio Missions players
Tucson Padres players
Scranton/Wilkes-Barre RailRiders players
Major League Baseball pitchers
Major League Baseball players from Australia
Sportspeople from Geelong
Windy City ThunderBolts players
Amarillo Thunderheads players
Peoria Javelinas players
Gigantes del Cibao players
Australian expatriate baseball players in the Dominican Republic
New Orleans Zephyrs players
Minor league baseball coaches